The British Journal of Management is a quarterly peer-reviewed academic journal, which was established by David T. Otley in 1990, and is published by Wiley-Blackwell on behalf of the British Academy of Management. The current editors-in-chief are Riikka Sarala of UNC Greensboro, USA, Shuang Ren of Deakin University, Australia and Paul Hibbert of University of St Andrews, UK.

The stated mission of the journal is to publish "empirical, conceptual and methodological articles across the full range of business and management disciplines", and to disseminate research that has the potential to make a "marked and positive impact on our social and work lives". The journal does not accept review papers and papers based on surveys of students. Review papers are directed to its sister journal, the International Journal of Management Reviews, also published by the British Academy of Management.

The early history of the journal has been outlined by its second former editor-in-chief Gerard P. Hodgkinson.

Abstracting and indexing 
The British Journal of Management is abstracted and indexed in the Social Sciences Citation Index, Scopus, ProQuest, EBSCO, PsycINFO, and Emerald Management Reviews. According to the Journal Citation Reports, the British Journal of Management has a 2021 impact factor of 7.450. This places the journal 48th out of 226 journals in the 'Management' category, and 41st out of 155 journals in the 'Business' category.

Special issues 
Throughout its history the British Journal of Management has published "special issues", which focus on particular interdisciplinary themes. For example, it published a special issue titled 'Facing the Future: The Nature and Purpose of Management Research Re-assessed', in which a range of established researchers (including Neil Anderson, Christopher Grey, Peter Herriot, Anne Huff, Andrew Pettigrew, Karl Weick) responded to a focal paper by Ken Starkey and Paula Madan, which examined "the relevance gap in management research." Recent special issues have included Impact of COVID‐19 (July 2020 issue), which explored new directions in management research and communications, and The Grand Challenge of Energy Transitions (July 2021 issue), a joint initiative with the Journal of International Business Studies, which investigated the long-term energy transition from high carbon-emitting energy supply to lower emission and emission-free energy sources.

Past editors 
 David T. Otley, Lancaster University, UK; founding editor; 1990–1998
 Gerard P. Hodgkinson, The University of Manchester, UK; 1999–2006
 Rolf Van Dick, Goethe University, Germany; 2006-2009
 Mustafa Özbilgin, Brunel Business School, London, UK; 2010-2013
 Geoffrey Wood, Western University, Canada; 2014-2019
 Pawan Budhwar, Aston Business School, UK; 2014-2020
 Douglas Cumming, Florida Atlantic University, USA; 2020-2022

References

External links 
 
 British Academy of Management

Business and management journals
Wiley-Blackwell academic journals
English-language journals
Publications established in 1990
Quarterly journals
Academic journals associated with learned and professional societies of the United Kingdom